The Naypyidaw Zoological Gardens located in Naypyidaw is the largest zoo in South East Asia. Located on the Yangon-Mandalay highway about 250 miles (400 km) north of Yangon, the 612-acre (247-hectare) zoo opened its doors on Myanmar's Armed Forces Day (27 March) in 2008 with about 420 animals trucked in from the Yangon Zoological Gardens.

The zoo has elephants, crocodiles, tigers, deer, leopards, monkeys as well as white tigers, zebras, and kangaroos. It also comes complete with an air-conditioned penguin house in a country of persistent power shortages.

In December 2009, the zoo had 634 animals of 89 species, including 304 from 34 different mammal species; 265 from 44 bird species; and 65 from 11 reptile species.

See also
 National Herbal Park
 Naypyidaw Safari Park
 Naypyidaw Water Fountain Garden
 Yadanabon Zoological Gardens
 Yangon Zoological Gardens

References

Zoos in Myanmar
Buildings and structures in Naypyidaw
Zoos established in 2008
2008 establishments in Myanmar